Aschema is a genus of spiders in the family Zodariidae. It was first described in 1991 by Jocqué. , it contains 2 species, both found in Madagascar.

References

Zodariidae
Araneomorphae genera
Spiders of Madagascar